Kris Tassell (born 16 September 1973) is a former Wales international rugby league footballer who played in the 1990s and 2000s.

Background
Born in Mount Isa, Tassell, who is of Welsh descent through his grandparents, played his junior rugby league for the Cairns Kangaroos and attended Trinity Anglican School before being signed by the Canberra Raiders.

Playing career
In Round 10 of the 1992 NSWRL season, he made his first grade in the Raiders' 31–12 loss to the Parramatta Eels.

In 1995, Tassell joined the Canterbury-Bankstown Bulldogs, playing four first grade games, spending the majority of the season in reserve grade. In 1996, he returned to Queensland, signing with the North Queensland Cowboys. That season, he scored eight tries in nine games before a knee injury against the Newcastle Knights in Round 11 ended his season. He finished the year as the club's equal-top try scorer. In 1998, after just three games in 1997, Tassell became a regular starter for the Cowboys, playing 18 games on the wing. In 1999, his final year at the club, he played 12 games.

In 2000, Tassell joined the Salford City Reds in the Super League. He played 26 games that season, mainly at centre, scoring seven tries. Later the year, he represented Wales at the Rugby League World Cup. In their first group game against the Cook Islands, he scored a hat trick and was named Man of the Match. In their semi-final loss to Australia, he scored a try in the 22–46 defeat.

In 2002, after two seasons with Salford, Tassell moved to Wakefield Trinity, where he scored 10 tries in 24 games. In 2003, Tassell played for the Swinton Lions in the National League Two. In November 2003, he once again scored a try against Australia in Wales' 4–76 loss on the 2003 Kangaroo tour of Great Britain and France.

Statistics

NSWRL/ARL/Super League/NRL

Super League

International

Personal life
Tassell's older brothers, Brad and Jason, were both professional rugby league players.

References

External links
Bulldogs profile
Wales All time records

1973 births
Living people
Australian people of Welsh descent
Australian rugby league players
Canberra Raiders players
Canterbury-Bankstown Bulldogs players
North Queensland Cowboys players
Rugby league centres
Rugby league fullbacks
Rugby league players from Mount Isa
Rugby league wingers
Salford Red Devils players
Swinton Lions players
Wakefield Trinity players
Wales national rugby league team players